Thomas Kiernan may refer to:

 Tommy Kiernan (1918–1991), Scottish footballer
 Thomas Kiernan (biographer) (1933–2003), American writer
 Tom Kiernan (born 1939), Ireland rugby union player